Gornje Vreme is a village on the banks of the Reka River in the Municipality  of Divača in the Littoral region of Slovenia.

Notable people
Notable people that were born or lived in Gornje Vreme include:
Bogomir Magajna (1904–1963), psychiatrist and writer

References

External links 

Gornje Vreme on Geopedia

Populated places in the Municipality of Divača